Erbulozole (R55104) is a congener of the microtubule inhibitor tubulozole. It is undergoing phase I clinical trials as a chemotherapeutic agent.

Synthesis

References

Other reading

 

Experimental cancer drugs